At the Beginning of Glorious Days is the second part of a two-part film that started with The Youth of Peter the Great. Both parts were released in the Soviet Union in 1980 and are based on a novel, Peter I, written by Aleksey Tolstoy. The film was directed by Russian director Sergey Gerasimov.  The movie is considered to be a classic of Russian historical cinema.

Synopsis
In late 17th-century Russia, Czar Peter the Great orders an attack on Turkey, which refuses to pay taxes to the Russian government. The Russian military is equipped with outdated technology, and they suffer their first defeat. After the defeat the czar orders the building of a fleet, and sends many educated men to study in Germany, France, and Holland. Russian victory over Turkey will not only force the Turks to pay taxes, but also make the Sea of Azov accessible to the Russians.

Cast
Dmitri Zolotukhin — Peter the Great
Tamara Makarova — Natalya Naryshkina
Aleksandr Belyavskiy — Lev Naryshkin, Peter's uncle
Natalya Bondarchuk — Czarevna Sophia
Nikolai Yeremenko Jr. — Aleksandr Danilovich Menshikov
Mikhail Nozhkin — Knyaz Boris Alexeyevich Galitzine
Boris Khmelnitsky — Kuzma Chermnyi
Lyubov Germanova — Eudoxia Lopukhina
Ivan Lapikov — Zhemov
Lyubov Polekhina — Sanka Brovkina
Marina Levtova — Olga Bulnosova
Yekaterina Vasilyeva — Antonida Bulnosova
Pyotr Glebov — Gypsy
Marina Golub — Verka
Muza Krepkogorskaya — Sparrow caregiver
Yury Moroz — Alyosha Brovkin
Peter Reusse — Franz Lefort
Eduard Bocharov — Merchant Ivan Brovkin
Anatoli Barantsev — Nikita Zotov
Roman Filippov — Fyodor Romodanovsky
Vladimir Kashpur — Ovdokim
Nikolai Grinko — Starets Nektari

References

External links

At the beginning of glorious days Russian Cinema Council catalogue

1980s historical drama films
Soviet historical drama films
Russian historical drama films
Films directed by Sergei Gerasimov
Gorky Film Studio films
Films about the Russian Empire
Films set in the 17th century
Cultural depictions of Peter the Great